This is a list of Catholic churches in China.

Cathedrals
See: List of cathedrals in China#Roman Catholic
Cathedral of the Immaculate Conception, Beijing
Church of St Joseph, Beijing
St. Theresa's Cathedral of Changchun
Cathedral of the Immaculate Conception, Chengdu
St. Joseph's Cathedral, Chongqing
Aowei Church of Holy Rosary, Fuzhou
Saint Dominic's Cathedral, Fuzhou
Sacred Heart Cathedral of Guangzhou
Immaculate Conception Cathedral of Hangzhou
Cathedral of St. Thomas, Hefei
Sacred Heart Cathedral (Jinan)
Cathedral of the Immaculate Conception in Nanjing
St. Michael's Cathedral, Qingdao
Saint Ignatius Cathedral, Shanghai
Sacred Heart Cathedral of Shenyang
St. Joseph Cathedral (Tianjin)
St. Francis Cathedral of Xi'an
Cathedral of the Angels, Xichang

Basilicas
Sheshan Basilica

Other churches
Church of Our Lady of Mount Carmel, Beijing
Church of the Saviour, Beijing
Dalian Catholic Church
Our Lady of Lourdes Church, Mianyang
Saint Peter's Church, Shanghai
Church of Christ the King, Xiamen

See also
List of Roman Catholic dioceses in China
Roman Catholicism in China

 
China, Catholic
Churches, Catholic
China
Catholic churches